Karasica  is a village in the administrative district of Gmina Głowno, within Zgierz County, Łódź Voivodeship, in central Poland. In Karasicy is a club for children and youth under the cat "

References

Karasica